" Wearin' That Loved-On Look" is a song by Nashville songwriters Dallas Frazier and A.L. "Doodle" Owens. It was recorded in 1969 by Elvis Presley for his album From Elvis in Memphis. In 1993 Marco T sang the Spanish version in Colombia on the soundtrack Christmas album. The song was also covered by the Canadian band, The Sadies, on their 2001 album, Tremendous Efforts.

References

Elvis Presley songs
Songs written by Dallas Frazier
Songs written by A.L. "Doodle" Owens
1969 songs